The following is a list of hospitals in the Democratic Republic of the Congo.

Kinshasa

 HJ Hospitals (private)
 General Hospital of Kinshasa (public) (former Maman Yemo Hospital)
 Cliniques Universitaires de Kinshasa (public)
 L'hôpital du Cinquantenaire
 Clinique Ngaliema (public)
 Saint Josutrutreph Hospital (non profit/diocesan)
 Mutombo Dikembe Hospital (private)
 Nganda Hospital (private)
 Monkole Mother & Child Hospital (non-profit)
 Centre Medical de Kinshasa (private)
 Centre Medical Phenix (private)
 Bondeko Clinic (private)
 D.H.K : De Smet Hospital of Kinsuka (private)

Goma
 General Hospital of Goma/Hopital Provincial du Nord Kivu (public)
 Heal Africa Hospital (private)
 CBCA Virunga Hospital ( non profit/ Protestant)
 CIMAK Hospital ( private)
 Kyeshero Hospital ( non profit/ Protestant),
Goma Sanru Hospital (non profit/Protestant)
Charité Maternelle Hospital,
CBCA Ndosho Hospital, 
Skyborne Hospital/Goma,
Centre Medical Alanine
Centre Medical GESOM
Centre Hospitalier La Providence.
CLOIC Clinique Oncologique Integrative du Congo

Kisantu
Saint Luke Hospital (non profit/diocesan)

Kimpese
Kimpese Sanru Hospital (non profit/Protestant)

References

Hospitals
Congo, Democratic Republic Of The
Congo